Alumohydrocalcite (IMA symbol: Ahcal) is a calcium aluminium carbonate mineral with the chemical formula CaAl(CO)(OH)·4HO). Its type locality is Khakassia, Russia.

References

External links 

 Alumohydrocalcite data sheet
 Alumohydrocalcite on the Handbook of Minerals

Aluminium minerals
Carbonate minerals
Calcium minerals